Michael "Mick" Garvey (born 16 October 1965) is a former Australian rules footballer who played with Carlton in the Victorian Football League (VFL).

Garvey was best on ground in Corowa Rutherglen's senior's 1984 Coreen & District Football League's premiership, before playing three seasons of Ovens & Murray football with Wodonga prior to playing with Carlton.

Garvey was selected by Geelong in the 1990 VFL Pre-season draft but failed to play a senior game with the Cats. Garvey played in Wodonga's 1990 and 1992 Ovens & Murray premierships and enjoyed a fine career their for many more years, playing 161 games.

Garvey later played in the Tallangatta & District Football League and won Barnawartha's best and fairest award in 1996.

Notes

External links

Michael Garvey's profile at Blueseum

1965 births
Carlton Football Club players
Wodonga Football Club players
Australian rules footballers from Victoria (Australia)
Living people